Daniel Gross may refer to:
 Daniel Gross (journalist)
 Daniel Gross (software entrepreneur)

See also
 Daniel J. Gross Catholic High School, Nebraska, United States
 Dan Gross, American public relations and crisis communications professional
 Dan Gross (activist), president of the Brady Campaign to Prevent Gun Violence